Nokhvod Tappeh (also Romanized as Nokhowd Tappeh; also known as Nukbūd Tepe) is a village in Sarab Rural District, in the Central District of Sonqor County, Kermanshah Province, Iran. At the 2006 census, its population was 323, in 80 families.

References 

Populated places in Sonqor County